California Firebrand is a 1948 American Western film directed by Philip Ford and written by J. Benton Cheney, John K. Butler and Royal K. Cole. The film stars Monte Hale, Lorna Gray, Paul Hurst, Alice Tyrrell, Tristram Coffin and LeRoy Mason. The film was released on April 1, 1948 by Republic Pictures.

Plot

Cast   
Monte Hale as Monte Hale
Lorna Gray as Joyce Mason 
Paul Hurst as Chuck Waggoner
Alice Tyrrell as Dulcey Waggoner
Tristram Coffin as Jim Requa aka Jud Babbit
LeRoy Mason as Luke Hartell
Douglas Evans as Lance Dawson
Sarah Edwards as Granny Hortense Mason
Dan Sheridan as Gunsmoke Lowery 
Duke York as Chad Mason
Lanny Rees as Rick Mason
Foy Willing as Guitar Player Foy Willing
Riders of the Purple Sage as Musicians

References

External links 
 

1948 films
American Western (genre) films
1948 Western (genre) films
Republic Pictures films
Films directed by Philip Ford
Trucolor films
1940s English-language films
1940s American films